William Robertson (born 22 September 1940) is a New Zealand former cricketer. He played four first-class matches for Otago in 1960/61.

See also
 List of Otago representative cricketers

References

External links
 

1940 births
Living people
New Zealand cricketers
Otago cricketers
People from Ranfurly, New Zealand